The Cabinet of Paraguay is composed of twelve cabinet ministers. Each is appointed by the President of Paraguay, and serves as the head of a particular executive department.

The Cabinet

Past Cabinets

2013 Cabinet

References 

Government of Paraguay

Paraguay